New Mexico State Road 423 (NM 423) is a  state highway entirely within Bernalillo County, New Mexico. For its entire length, NM-423 is signed as Paseo del Norte in Albuquerque.

Route description

The highway's western terminus is at Golf Course Road and then proceeds east intersecting NM 45 (signed as Coors Blvd). The highway then continues east intersecting several state highways, and Interstate 25 (I-25). The highway's eastern terminus is at an intersection with NM 556.

From NM 45 to I-25, NM 423 is a freeway with a  speed limit. From I-25 to its eastern terminus at NM 556, NM 423 is a 6-lane divided highway with at-grade intersections with speed limits of 45-55 MPH. Initial proposals to reconstruct its interchange with I-25 would have also extended the freeway portion of NM 423 east from Jefferson Boulevard east to Louisiana Boulevard. The scaled back design added two flyover ramps to provide high-speed nonstop access between I-25 northbound and NM 423 westbound and also NM 423 eastbound and I-25 southbound. The signalized intersections with the I-25 frontage roads remain in place, the same with at-grade intersections with San Pedro Road and Louisiana Boulevard (to the east of I-25).

History

The highway's bridge over the Rio Grande opened in December 1987 and primarily served commuter traffic from Rio Rancho. Paseo del Norte was originally conceived as part of a  freeway beltway system around central Albuquerque that was never fully built.

2010s reconstruction

The New Mexico Department of Transportation (NMDOT) approved a construction design at a cost of US$93 million, US$55 million of which comes from Bernalillo County and the City of Albuquerque, US$29.75 million from the State of New Mexico, and the other US$8.25 million from federal funding. Funding was approved in November 2012; construction began in October 2013, and was completed in December 2014. The completed interchange allowed for unimpeded access on Paseo from I-25 all the way to Golf Course Road, reducing travel times and congestion for the West Side areas and Rio Rancho.

A hybrid stack interchange was built at Paseo Del Norte and I-25, it consists of a fly-over ramp carrying two lanes from Northbound I-25 to Westbound Paseo Del Norte and also a ramp from Eastbound Paseo Del Norte to Southbound I-25, the latter of which goes under the southbound I-25 frontage road. A new loop entrance ramp from Westbound Paseo Del Norte to Southbound I-25 was also built.

A single point urban interchange was also constructed at Jefferson Street, a major artery through Journal Center that had become congested due to the growth of west side neighborhoods. Traffic using the flyover from northbound I-25 to westbound Paseo Del Norte are not able to exit at Jefferson Street.

Major intersections

Future plans
The Mid Region Council of Governments (MRCOG) is proposing to start a bus rapid transit service on Paseo Del Norte. This route would start in southwest Rio Rancho, cross the River on Paseo Del Norte, and terminate south of Journal Center. Plans also call for a connection to another planned BRT route on University to UNM, CNM, and the Sunport. In order to facilitate this new route, the lanes on Paseo Del Norte would be reduced from 6 to 4 for automobile traffic, with the other 2 lanes becoming BRT dedicated lanes. Park and Ride locations would also be built on the west side.

Long-term plans call for NM-423 to be extended westward along Paseo Del Norte from NM-45 (Coors Blvd) to the planned Paseo Del Volcan (NM-347) west of Double Eagle II Airport when NM-347 is eventually constructed from its present terminus in Rio Rancho to I-40 at Nine Mile Hill.

See also

References

External links

 Paseo-I25 Project (NMDOT)
  Mrcog-nm.gov (2)

423
Transportation in Bernalillo County, New Mexico